Dead Heat on a Merry-Go-Round is a 1966 crime film written and directed by Bernard Girard, and starring James Coburn. It marked Harrison Ford's film debut.

Plot
Con man Eli Kotch charms his way into a parole by playing on the emotions of a pretty psychologist, but drops her at the first opportunity to move around the country, romancing women and then stealing their possessions, or those of their employers. He has made a down payment on the blueprints to a bank at Los Angeles International Airport, but needs to raise $85,000 to complete the purchase.

In Boston, he seduces and marries Inger Knudsen, the secretary of a wealthy elderly woman. Eli sends her to L.A. to set up housekeeping, on the pretext that a songwriter there is interested in his poetry.  Meanwhile, he burgles another woman to get the final amount of money he needs. Eli heads to Los Angeles, where he begins to assemble his gang for the bank robbery, which is timed to take place while the airport is distracted by the arrival of the Premier of the Soviet Union.

To keep her occupied, Eli sends Inger to take Polaroid snapshots around L.A., supposedly for a magazine article he is writing. Using costumes stolen from a movie studio, he and one of the gang masquerade as an Australian policeman escorting an extradited prisoner in order to get through airport security, while the other two dress as LAPD policemen to get into the bank, bypass the alarm, and get a bank employee to open the safe.

The gang pulls off the heist and makes a successful getaway to Mexico on a plane. Eli has no idea that Inger has been frantically trying to get in touch with him, because she has inherited $7 million from her former employer.

Cast
James Coburn as Eli Kotch
Camilla Sparv as Inger Knudson
Aldo Ray as Eddie Hart
Nina Wayne as Frieda Schmid
Robert Webber as Milo Stewart
Rose Marie as Margaret Kirby
Marian McCargo as Dr. Marion Hague
Michael Strong as Paul Feng
Severn Darden as Miles Fisher
James Westerfield as Jack Balter
Phillip Pine as George Logan
Simon Scott as William Anderson
Harrison Ford as a bellhop (uncredited)

Cast notes
Sparv was named "New Female Star of the Year" by the Hollywood Foreign Press Association.

Production
Working titles for this film were "Eli Kotch" and "The Big Noise". The actual title used, Dead Heat on a Merry-Go-Round appears in the film as the novel being written by Coburn's character under the pseudonym of "Henry Silverstein".  Dead Heat on a Merry-Go-Round was later used as the title of a book of short stories written by Japanese author Haruki Murakami and first published in 1985.

The film was shot in Boston and Los Angeles, including at the Los Angeles International Airport.

See also
List of American films of 1966

References

External links

1966 films
American heist films
1960s heist films
Films directed by Bernard Girard
Columbia Pictures films
Films scored by Stu Phillips
1960s English-language films
1960s American films